The 1992 PPG Indy Car World Series season was the 14th national championship season of American open wheel racing sanctioned by CART (d.b.a "IndyCar"). The season consisted of 16 races. Bobby Rahal was the national champion, his third and final career CART title. Stefan Johansson was named the Rookie of the Year. The 1992 Indianapolis 500 was sanctioned by USAC, but counted towards the CART points championship. Al Unser Jr. won the Indy 500 in the closest finish in the history of that event.

Starting in 1992, and continuing through 1996, the CART organization began operating under the name IndyCar. The term IndyCar was a registered trademark of IMS, Inc., and was licensed to CART from 1992–1996. The use of the term "CART" was curtailed in the series and in the media in favor of IndyCar during this period.

The circuit welcomed a new venue in 1992, New Hampshire International Speedway.

Bobby Rahal, who was in his first season as an owner/driver, won four races and three poles en route to the title. Rahal's three oval wins included a dominating wire-to-wire victory at Phoenix, where he led all 200 laps. Rahal fielded the "tried and true" Lola/Ilmor Chevrolet "A" combination. It was the final championship for the Ilmor Chevy A engine. Rahal managed to outperform the newer engines that joined the series in 1992, the Ford/Cosworth XB, as well as the Ilmor Chevy "B" engine, which was used by the Penske team. For the third time, Michael Andretti finished runner-up to Rahal in the points. Andretti promptly left Indy car racing the following year to race in Formula One. 

A bevy of crashes, some serious, at the 1992 Indianapolis 500 injured several drivers, and shook up the driver lineup during parts of the season. Jovy Marcelo was fatally injured in a practice crash, while Nelson Piquet suffered devastating leg injures in another practice crash. Hiro Matsushita suffered a fractured leg and missed several races over the summer. Mario Andretti, Rick Mears, and Jimmy Vasser all sat out the race at Detroit while they recovered from injuries. In July, Mears dropped out of the Michigan 500 with nagging injuries, and ultimately sat out the rest of the season. Mears then unexpectedly retired from racing in December.

Drivers and constructors 
The following teams and drivers competed in the 1992 Indy Car World Series season.

Season Summary

Schedule

 Oval/Speedway
 Dedicated road course
 Temporary street circuit
NC Non-championship event
Indianapolis was USAC-sanctioned but counted towards the PPG Indy Car title.

Race results

Final driver standings

Note:  Jovy Marcelo was killed in practice for the 1992 Indianapolis 500. He was 27 years old.

Nation's Cup 

 Top result per race counts towards Nation's Cup.

Chassis Constructor's Cup

Engine Manufacturer's Cup

References

See also
 1992 Indianapolis 500
 1992 Toyota Atlantic Championship season
 1992 Indy Lights season
 1992 Formula One season

Champ Car seasons
IndyCar
IndyCar